Formica neogagates is a species of ant in the family Formicidae. Found throughout North America and Canada, introduced in Europe, France.

References

Further reading

External links

 

neogagates
Articles created by Qbugbot
Insects described in 1903